Turvelândia is a municipality in eastern Goiás state, Brazil.

Location
Turvelândia is located 65 km. east of Rio Verde

Highway connections from Goiânia are made by state highway BR-060 west from Goiânia, through / Abadia de Goiás / Guapó / Indiara /  Acreúna/  GO-164 / Santa Helena de Goiás / BR-452 / GO-409 / Maurilândia. 
Neighboring municipalities:  Acreúna, Edéia, Santa Helena de Goiás, Maurilândia

Political Information
Mayor: Eduardo Mendonça (January 2005)
City council: 09 members
Eligible voters: 3,348 (December/2007)

Demographic Information
Population density: 4.1 inhabitants/km2 (2007)
Urban population: 2,865 (2007)
Rural population: 987 (2007)
Population growth: a loss of about 1,800 people since 1991

Economic Information
The economy is based on subsistence agriculture, cattle raising, services, public administration, and small transformation industries.

Public administration provided jobs for 238 workers in 2003.
  
Industrial units: 3 (2007) 
Commercial units: 32 (2007)
Destillary: Vale do Verdão S/A (2007)
Motor vehicles: 233 (2007), which gave a ratio of 16 inhabitants for each motor vehicle
Cattle herd: 45,000 head (3,600 milk cows) (2006)
Main crops: cotton,  rice, sugarcane (11,200 hectares), manioc, corn (3,000 hectares), sorghum, and soybeans (14,000 hectares).

Education (2006)
Schools: 4 with 1,075 students
Higher education: none
Adult literacy rate: 79.6% (2000) (national average was 86.4%)

Health (2007)
Hospitals: 1
Hospital beds: 13
Ambulatory clinics: 3
Infant mortality rate: 38.71 (2000) (national average was 33.0)

Municipal Human Development Index
MHDI:  0.685
State ranking:  220 (out of 242 municipalities in 2000)
National ranking:  3,223 (out of 5,507 municipalities in 2000)

Data are from 2000

For the complete list see Frigoletto.com

See also
List of municipalities in Goiás
Microregions of Goiás

References

Frigoletto

Municipalities in Goiás